The Stuart C. Siegel Center is a  multi-purpose facility on the campus of Virginia Commonwealth University in Richmond, Virginia, United States.  The facility's main component is the 7,637-(expandable to 8,000) seat E.J. Wade Arena. It also served as a student recreational area until 2010, when the new Cary Street Gym complex was completed. It now is used purely for VCU athletics and includes a weight room, auxiliary basketball court, and a cafè. The E.J. Wade Arena hosts Division I level NCAA inter-collegiate athletics and serves as a general-purpose assembly space for special events such as graduations, concerts, receptions, and a variety of competitions (both athletic and non athletic).  It is named after Richmond businessman Stuart C. Siegel.

The complex opened in 1999 and cost $30.1 million to construct.  $7 million of the cost was donated by local businessman Stuart C. Siegel; the center bears his name as a result. Its main tenant is the VCU Rams men's basketball team, which enjoys one of the nation's best home court winning percentages since moving into the facility. The court has received the reputation as arguably the toughest place to play in the Atlantic 10 Conference. The VCU Rams men's basketball team currently holds the 11th-highest home court winning percentage in Division I basketball with a winning percentage of 85.79 The student section, dubbed the "Rowdy Rams", is extremely passionate and near deafening during contests.  In 2012–2013, the Rowdy Rams received the Naismith Student Section of the Year Award, recognizing the best student section in college basketball. Since January 2011, every home game at the Siegel Center has been sold out and the streak currently stands at 134 (as of 3/8/19). 
The arena also routinely hosts local and state high school basketball tournaments, in addition to hosting the annual Virginia Regional (formerly VCU/NASA) FIRST Robotics Competition.

Before the 2016-2017 basketball season, the arena was renamed the E.J. Wade Arena; a construction company owned by a local family in Mechanicsville, VA.  The deal is for $2.75 million over ten years, but the Wade family has promised a total monetary donation of $4.05 million over those ten years.

Expansion

Future Expansion
Plans are in the works to upgrade the Siegel Center's capacity to 10,000 seats with a total cost of $12 million. The Rams have sold out the arena for more than 100 straight games, and currently there is a wait list of 1,100 people for season tickets.

Recent expansion
In 2011, a $3.4 million facelift to the Siegel Center saw offices renovated, with the addition of luxury suites, a 120-club seat balcony, and the Tommy J. West Club, a new lounge.  In 2014, the most major renovation since the Tommy J. West club was completed.  Four corporate corner suites were installed in one end of the arena.  A new Daktronics HD center-hung scoreboard was installed at center court, it features four 11.5' by 15.5' panels, and the lower ring is 2' high by 15.5' wide.  The Tommy J. West club was also outfitted with a large HD ribbon board that measures 2.5' high by 136' wide.  The old center-hung audio system was also replaced.  Now, speakers are peppered throughout the arena's roof to further immense the audience in the action.  The total cost of the renovation was $1.9 million.  In 2016, the arena added four more corporate corner suites opposite the arena side that was completed in 2014.  All four corners of the Siegel Center now have suites.  There are four smaller ones which cost $45,000, and four larger ones which cost $60,000.  Each suite requires a three-year commitment.

See also
 List of NCAA Division I basketball arenas

References

External links
Official website
Basketball fans pack the Siegel Center for Rams Madness
Whelliston: Grant, VCU staying cool in CAA's heat
VCU Office of Development and Alumni Relations

College basketball venues in the United States
Indoor arenas in Virginia
Basketball venues in Virginia
Sports venues in Richmond, Virginia
VCU Rams basketball
Sports venues completed in 1999
1999 establishments in Virginia